The West Penn Trail is a 17-mile long rail trail in western Pennsylvania. It runs on old rail alignments of the Conemaugh Line near the Conemaugh River.

See also
 Ghost Town Trail
 Westmoreland Heritage Trail

References

External links

 
 
 

Rail trails in Pennsylvania
National Recreation Trails in Pennsylvania